CP Sinha is a senior leader of the Janata Dal (United). He was elected unopposed to the Bihar Legislative Council on 3 June 2016.

References

Janata Dal (United) politicians
Living people
Year of birth missing (living people)
Members of the Bihar Legislative Council